The Ministry of Science, Technology and Innovation, abbreviated MOSTI, is a ministry of the Government of Malaysia.

In the Seventh Mahathir cabinet, the entire component of the Ministry of Science, Technology and Innovation (MOSTI), Green Technology and Energy Components from the Ministry of Energy, Green Technology and Water (KeTTHA) and related components of Climate Change and Environment from the Ministry of Natural resources and Environment (NRE) has been restructured and formed the Ministry of Energy, Science, Technology, Environment & Climate Change (MESTECC). After the 2020 Malaysian political crisis, MESTECC has been restructured and its name has been changed to the Ministry of Science, Technology and Innovation (MOSTI) following the formation of the Muhyiddin cabinet.In the Anwar Ibrahim cabinet, the ministry was renamed to Ministry of Science and Technology with the removal of the innovation portfolio from the name.

The current Minister of Science, Technology and Innovation has been Chang Lih Kang since 3 December 2022.

Division and section

Planning and STI Culturation Sectors 
 Strategic Planning Division
 Strategic Data and Foresight Technology Division
 Malaysian Science and Technology Information Centre (MASTIC)
 STI and Culturation Services Division
 National Planetarium
 National Science Centre

Technology Development, Commercialization and STI Services Sector 
 Strategic technology and S&T Applications Division
 National Nanotechnology Centre (NNC)
 Commercialization Division
 Fund Division

Management Sector 
 Human Resource Management Division
 Finance Division
 Development Division
 Account Division
 Information Technology Management Division
 Administration Division

Divisions & Units under Secretary General 
 Legal Unit
 Corporate Communication Unit
 Internal Audit Unit
 Integrity Unit
 International Division

Departments and agencies 
 Atomic Energy Licensing Board (LPTA), or Lembaga Perlesenan Tenaga Atom. (Official site)
 Department of Chemistry Malaysia (JKM), or Jabatan Kimia Malaysia. (Official site)
 Malaysian Nuclear Agency, or Agensi Nuklear Malaysia. (Official site)
 Malaysian Space Agency (MYSA), or Agensi Angkasa Malaysia. (Official site)

See also 
 Minister of Science and Technology (Malaysia)

References

External links 
 Official portal

Federal ministries, departments and agencies of Malaysia